Brotherhood is a British sitcom that has broadcast on Comedy Central since 2 June 2015. It was cancelled after one series.

Premise
The series centres around three brothers: Dan (age 25), Toby (aged 23) and Jamie (aged 14). Since their mother died six months before the events of the series, Dan and Toby have become the guardians of Jamie who hasn't said a word since the death. The two also have to get their aunt Debbie off their backs as she believes that she should be the one caring for Jamie.

Cast

Main cast 
 Ben Ashenden as Dan, the eldest of the three brothers. He is a sarcastic joker and is forever trying to get the upper hand on his live wire colleague Poppy. (8 episodes)
 Johnny Flynn as Toby, the middle brother. He is a naive sweetheart, laid back and hopes to get together with Jamie's teacher Miss Pemberton. (8 episodes)
 Scott Folan as Jamie, the youngest brother (14 yrs old). Since his mother's death, he hasn't said a word and is stuck in the middle when Dan and Toby clash. (8 episodes)
 Gemma Chan as Miss Pemberton, Jamie's teacher. She had a one-night stand with Toby who still wishes to be with her. (3 episodes)
 Ellie Taylor as Poppy, Dan's colleague. She is a magazine journalist and quite a live wire. (8 episodes)
 Sarah Hadland as Aunt Debbie, Christopher's mother and Dan, Toby and Jamie's aunt. She feels that she should have been the rightful guardian of Jamie and seems more concerned about his welfare and upbringing than that of her own son Christopher.(4 episodes)

Guest stars 
 Dillon Cox as Christopher, Debbie's son and Dan, Toby and Jamie's cousin. (1 episode)
 Joseph Alessi as Alfonso (1 episode)
 Ewan Bailey as Uncle Borek (1 episode)
 David Brain as Guy Bolton (1 episode)
 Jack Brazil as Steve (1 episode)
 Simon Brzezicki as Bus Driver (1 episode)
 Georgina Campbell as Katherine (1 episode)
 Nicholas Croucher as Wildman (1 episode)
 Mark Davison as Boat Guy (1 episode)
 Joey Ellis as Jack (1 episode)
 Cameron Farrelly as Cool Kid (1 episode)
 Alhaji Fofana as El Diabolo (1 episode)
 James Gordon as Bearded Gamer (1 episode)
 Francis Johnson as Delivery Man (1 episode)
 Charles Lawson as Aidan Barrett (1 episode)
 Alex Lowe as Commentator (1 episode)
 Stevie Martin as Ruth (1 episode)
 Tracy Ann Oberman as Terri (1 episode)
 Freya Parker as Margot (1 episode)
 Adam Prickett as office Worker (1 episode)
 Julia Rosnowska as Blanka (1 episode)
 Ahir Shah as Tom (1 episode)
 Andre Skeete as Man in office (1 episode)
Camille Ucan as Sophie (1 episode)
Tony Way as Barry (1 episode)
Spike White as Sir Fartalot (1 episode)

Episodes

Season 1 (2015)

External links
Official website

2010s British sitcoms
2015 British television series debuts
2015 British television series endings
English-language television shows
Comedy Central (British TV channel) original programming
British television sitcoms